Kurmali or Kudmali (ISO: Kuṛmāli) is an Indo-Aryan language classified as belonging to the Bihari group of languages spoken in eastern India. As a trade dialect, it is also known as Panchpargania (Bengali: পঞ্চপরগনিয়া), for the "five parganas" of the region it covers in Jharkhand. Kurmali language is spoken by around 5.5 lakh people mainly in fringe regions of Jharkhand, Odisha and West Bengal, also a sizable population speak Kurmali in Assam tea valleys. Intellectuals claim that Kurmali may be the nearest form of language used in Charyapada. Kurmali is one of the demanded languages for enlisting in Eighth Schedule to the Constitution of India.

Geographical distribution
Kurmali language is mainly spoken in three eastern states of India, that is, in southeastern district Seraikela Kharswan, East Singhbhum, West Singhbhum, Bokaro and Ranchi districts of Jharkhand; in northern district Mayurbhanj, Balasore, Kendujhar, Jajpur and Sundargarh of Odisha; and in south western district Paschim Medinipur, Jhargram, Bankura, Purulia and northern districts Maldah, Uttar Dinajpur, Dakhin Dinajpur, Jalpaiguri of West Bengal. Apart from the core area of the language, the language is also spoken in Udalguri and a few speakers are also found in Cachar, Santipur, Nagaon of Assam; the eastern districts of Chandrapur and Gadchiroli in Maharashtra. Apart from this, a few speakers are also found in the states of Uttar Pradesh, Bihar and in neighbour country  Bangladesh and Nepal.

During the British Raj, the Kurmali language was known as Panchpargania (meaning "five regions") for present-day Bundu, Barenda, Sonahatu (split into Sonahatu and Rahe), Silli, Tamar blocks of Ranchi district of Jharkhand state as a trade language between two linguistic region. Now the Sonahatu and Rahe make the core region of Panchpargania.

As per the Census of 2011, there are 3,11,175 Kurmali Thar speakers in India (hailing mostly from West Bengal, Odisha, Assam and Maharashtra) and 2,44,290 Panch Pargania speakers (mostly from Jharkhand), making a total of 555,465 Kurmali speakers in India. They are grouped under the umbrella of "Hindi languages". Note that both, Kurmali Thar and Panch Pargania are dialects of the Kurmali language.

Language variation 
The speakers of Kurmali are spread over a vast region of East India, especially in fringe areas of West Bengal, Jharkhand and Odisha. These states are mostly dominated by Bengali, Nagpuri and Odia speakers. And hence, local dialectal change and language shift can be noticed in these areas. As the Kurmi of West Bengal identifies themselves as the speaker of Kurmali but due to age-long settlement in the Bengali administrative region their language shifting towards Manbhum dialect of Bengali. As did in northern Odisha with Bengali and Odia admixture.
In Manbhum this [Kurmali] language (a kind of mixed dialect essentially Bihari in its nature, but with a curious Bengali colouring) is principally spoken by people of the KuRmi caste, who are numerous in the district of chotanagpur, and in the Orissa Tributary state of Mayurbhanja.

The Kurmali language bears 61%–86% lexical similarity with Panchpargania, 58%–72% with Khortha, 51%–73% with Nagpuri (Sadri), 46%–53% with Odia, 41%–55% with Bengali, 44%–58% with Hindi. Hence the Panchpargania is considered as a major variety of the Kurmali language, while sometime it's opined as a distinct language. Similarly due to great influence of Bengali language in Kurmali language (as the speaker of this language are in the process of shifting to regional dominant language), many linguistic label it as Jharkhandi Bangla and sometime it is clustered as Manbhumi dialect. It's also fact that the language closely resembles the Khortha language and has some good number loanwords from Munda language family, specifically from Santali language. Although not as much as Khortha language.

It is believed that the early form of the Kurmali language was spoken in Jharkhand (Manbhum region), the original homeland of the Kudmi Mahato. But now it is also influenced by Nagpuri (Sadri) language in Jharkhand. Although the language is now Indo-Aryan in nature, it has some distinctive feature like lexical items, grammatical markers and categories that are neither available in Indo-Aryan nor in Dravidian or even in the Munda language family. Thus it is believed that the language was at once a separate language. But because of its long settlement in the Aryan belt, the native speaker gradually abandoned the original structure and switched to the Aryan form of the language, bearing substrate of old.The language currently falls in 6b (threatened) and 7 (shifting) level of EGIDS, which are corresponding to the UNESCO language endangerment category level "Vulnerable" and "Definitely Endangered". But Ethnologue scaled Kurmali language in 6a (vigorous) level and its variety Panchpargania (widely used in Jharkhand) in 3 (trade) level of EGIDS, and both are corresponding to "Safe" status of UNESCO language endangerment category level.

Variety 
The language is transferred orally from generation to generation and the Kurmali language remains unstandardized due to influence of other Indo Aryan languages. Thus the speaker uses different variety and accent. However, language can be classified on the basis of the speakers territorial region, viz., Singhbhum Kudmali, Dhalbhum Kudmali, Ranchi Kudmali (Panchpargania), Manbhum Kudmali, Mayurbhanj Kudmali etc. are the major regional varieties. And all those varieties bear 58%–89% lexical similarity with each other.

Number 
The basic Kurmali cardinal numbers are:

Uses of Language 
The language Kurmali (Kudmali) is spoken by 555,465 people as a native language in India. Mainly by the Kurmi (Kudmi Mahato), the native user of the language. As per The People of India, the language is spoken by 10 communities as mother tongue, including two Scheduled Tribe and three Scheduled Caste communities. Those ten community include Bedia, Bagal, Dharua, Dom, Jolha, Kamar, Kumhar, Tanti, Nai, Ghasi, Karga, and Rautia. And bilingually spoken by tribals like Bhumij, Ho, Kharia, Lohara/Lohar, Mahli, Munda, Oraon, Santal, Savar and Bathudi communities.

The language created an identity in festival like Bandna, Tusu, Karam and Jhumair with the Jhumar song. In which the songs are formatted in Kurmali.

Education
There are some institutions, where the Kurmali language is a higher education core subject.
 Ranchi University, Ranchi
 Kolhan University, Chaibasa
 Binod Bihari Mahto Koylanchal University, Dhanbad
 Dr. Shyama Prasad Mukherjee University, Ranchi
 Sidho Kanho Birsha University, Purulia
 Jhargram University, Jhargram
 Vinoba Bhave University, Hazaribag
 Chitta Mahato Memorial College, Purulia

Notes

References

Bibliography

Further reading

Bihari languages
Languages of Bihar
Languages of Jharkhand
Languages of West Bengal
Languages of Odisha
Languages of Assam